Kathryn Jane Brown  is a British art historian and Lecturer in Art History and Visual Culture at Loughborough University.

Career
Educated at Seymour College, Adelaide, and the University of Adelaide, South Australia, Brown was awarded a Rhodes Scholarship. As a Rhodes Scholar, she completed a PhD (D.Phil) at Balliol College, Oxford under the supervision of Malcolm Bowie. Brown then became a private equity lawyer in the City of London. Trained at Slaughter and May, Brown worked as an associate successively at Slaughter and May and then became an associate, and later Counsel, in the London office of US law firm Milbank, Tweed, Hadley and McCloy. She then became a partner of the US law firm Paul Hastings, LLP. Following the completion of a second PhD at the University of London Brown returned to academia as a postdoctoral researcher at the University of British Columbia. She was subsequently appointed to a Lectureship in Art History at Tilburg University before moving to Loughborough. Brown is a Fellow of the Higher Education Academy. She is best known for her works on 19th-century and 20th-century French art, modernism, artists’ books, museology, and the art market with a particular focus on the works of Degas, Matisse and Tzara.

Books
 Matisse: A Critical Life], Reaktion Books, 2021
 Matisse’s Poets: Critical Performance in the Artist’s Book, Bloomsbury Academic, 2017
 Women Readers in French Painting 1870–1890, Ashgate, 2012

Edited
 The Art Book Tradition in Twentieth-Century Europe, Ashgate, 2013
 Interactive Contemporary Art: Participation in Practice, I.B. Tauris, 2014
 Perspectives on Degas, Routledge, 2017

References

External links
 Personal Website

Living people
Academic staff of Tilburg University
Year of birth missing (living people)
British art historians
British women academics
Academics of Loughborough University
Fellows of the Higher Education Academy
Australian Rhodes Scholars
French art critics
French women art critics
British art critics
British women art critics
Women art historians
British women historians
French women historians